Western Samoa at the 1994 Commonwealth Games was abbreviated SAM.

Medals

Gold
none

Silver
Bob Gasio — Boxing, Men's Light Middleweight

Bronze
none

References

Samoa at the Commonwealth Games
Commonwealth Games
Nations at the 1994 Commonwealth Games